Julien Chauvin (born 1979) is a French violinist and music director, specialized in the interpretation on period instruments and gut strings, co-founder of the orchestra the  (2004-2014), as well as the  (2007), and founder of the Concert de la Loge Olympique (2015).

Biography 

In 2003, he was laureate of the MAfestival Brugge.

He has a career as soloist, guest violinist, chamber musician and musical director.

In 2015, he decided to end his collaboration with Jérémie Rhorer to found a new orchestra, the Concert de la Loge Olympique, specialized in the interpretation of baroque, classical and romantic repertoires on ancient instruments.

Since 2008, he has also been working at the INSEAD, alongside Professor Ian Woodward, in training seminars for business leaders.

His discography includes eight discs recorded with the Cercle de l'Harmonie and the conductor Jérémie Rhorer for Virgin Classics, Eloquentia and Ambroisie-Naïve labels and five discs with the Cambini-Paris Quartet for the Timpani, MBF and Ambroisie-Naïve labels.

References

External links

 Julien Chauvin on France Musique
 Discography (Discogs)
 Site du Concert de la Loge
 Site du Quatuor Cambini-Paris
 Julien Chauvin violoniste et chef, le concert de la loge olympique-renaît
 Julien Chauvin (Les Échos)
 Le bel hommage de Mozart à Haydn
 Tami Krausz, With Julien Chauvin and 'Le Concert de la Loge' , Telemann TWV 52:e3 (YouTube)

21st-century French male classical violinists
1979 births
People from Fontainebleau
Living people